Shannon Baker (born 30 January 1980) is a New Zealand-born English rugby union player.

Baker played rugby league for the New Zealand Maori women's team.

References

1980 births
Living people
England women's international rugby union players
New Zealand female rugby league players
English female rugby union players
Female rugby league players
Female rugby union players
New Zealand emigrants to the United Kingdom